"Show Me Girl" is a song written by Gerry Goffin and Carole King and performed by Herman's Hermits. It reached #19 on the UK and Swedish charts and #25 in Australia in 1964.  The song was not released as a single in the United States and instead "Can't You Hear My Heartbeat" was released.  It was featured on their 1965 album, Herman's Hermits.  It was also featured on the band's second EP, Mrs. Brown, You've Got a Lovely Daughter (EP).

The song was produced by Mickie Most.

References

1964 songs
1964 singles
Songs with lyrics by Gerry Goffin
Songs written by Carole King
Herman's Hermits songs
Song recordings produced by Mickie Most
Columbia Records singles